Kanematsu Yamada (山田 兼松 , September 16, 1903 – August 27, 1977) was a Japanese long-distance runner. He competed in the 1928 Olympics marathon, finishing in fourth place.

References

1903 births
1977 deaths
Japanese male long-distance runners
Japanese male marathon runners
Olympic male marathon runners
Olympic athletes of Japan
Athletes (track and field) at the 1928 Summer Olympics
Japan Championships in Athletics winners